Pt Jawahar Lal Nehru Rajkiya Homeopathic Medical College and Hospital is a state run medical college located in Kanpur, Uttar Pradesh which was established in 1962 by the Homoeopathic Medical College Association.

References

External links
 Official website

 

Universities and colleges in Kanpur
Educational institutions established in 1962
1962 establishments in Uttar Pradesh
Homeopathic colleges